Sulechów  is a village in the administrative district of Gmina Kocmyrzów-Luborzyca, within Kraków County, Lesser Poland Voivodeship, in southern Poland. The village is located in the historical region of Lesser Poland.

References

Villages in Kraków County